Mystic is a comic book that was published by the Florida-based CrossGen Comics. Created by writer Ron Marz and artists Brandon Peterson and John Dell, it was one of five flagship titles in the company's Sigilverse shared universe. Mystic ran for 43 issues (July 2000 – January 2004).

Plot summary
Set on the planet Ciress, in which sorcery is an apprenticed profession organized in guilds, the story centered on sisters Genevieve and Giselle. The former had devoted her life to becoming a top sorceress; the latter is a spoiled socialite who much against her wishes is granted great power and responsibility via a mysterious sigil.

The magic guilds at the start of the series are:
Dark Magi Guild,
Astral Guild,
Shaman Guild,
Enchantress Guild,
Tantric Guild,
Djinn Guild, and
Nouveau Guild.

The first six issues of Mystic describe Giselle's gaining of the Sigil and the efforts of the guild leaders to regain her power. Giselle gains her Sigil in the first issue and without intending to, steals the spirits of the ancient (and long dead) guild leaders. She also gets a guide in the form of a talking cat-like creature with yellow eyes and a love interest named Thierry Chevailier (an artist but without any magical ability). Starting in issue #4, Giselle gains the attention of one of The First who goes by the name Darrow. At first Darrow seems to help Giselle but he is under orders from Ingra to sway Giselle to the side of House Sinister.

The efforts of the other guild leaders to strip Giselle of the spirits of the long dead guild leaders fail (issue #6) but the leaders of all but two of the magic guilds regard the situation as unacceptable. To destroy Giselle the guild leaders (with the exception of Astral and Nouveau) break the prison which confined Animora. This sets in motion a conflict which lasts for the next 12 issues between Giselle (and her sister Genevieve, the leader of the Nouveau guild) against Animora and the other guild leaders. Darrow rapidly switches sides and supports Animora also. With the reluctant aid of the spirits of the former guild leaders, Giselle is able to defeat all her enemies (issue #14 and again in issue #20) but at a cost.

After her second defeat, Animora was able to establish a psychic link to Giselle and over time this turned into a form of possession. As this control was growing, Giselle alienated her good friend Thierry Chevailier and he fell in love with the older sister Genevieve (issue #24). Eventually Giselle meets Ingra and after a battle - in which Ingra easily defeats Giselle - Ingra breaks Animora's hold over Giselle and imprisons Animora (issue #23). Part of the reason why Ingra is able to defeat Giselle is that due to Giselle's recent behavior, the spirits of the guild leaders refuse to help her. Giselle, without their aid, finds that her knowledge of magic is very poor. She resolves to become a master of magic and starts with learning the magic of the Nouveau guild from her sister Genevieve, before moving on to the Shaman guild, the Djinn guild and the Astral guild (issues #25–28).

Note: In CrossGen Chronicles #5 it was revealed that an eighth guild named Taroc had existed but vanished long ago. The Taroc guild leader sacrificed herself to imprison Animora, one of The First, who had been banished by Ingra, the leader of House Sinister.

It was later revealed that a secret guild exists (issue #33) called the Geometer guild; the members of which are allied with the Dark Magi guild and the Tantric guild. The Geometers believe themselves to be manipulators of all the other guilds; the guildmaster is named Archemus.

Characters 
Genevieve Villard is the older sister of Giselle, the Sigil-Bearer on her world of Ciress. Genevieve studied hard and moved up rapidly in the ranks of the Nouveau Mages' Guild. When the old guild leader died, Genevieve was chosen to be the new guild master. The Mystic series begins on the day of Genevieve's ascension to the rank of Guild master. On that day, Genevieve's younger sister Giselle is given a sigil on her hand and she then absorbs all the spirits of the long-dead guild masters of the seven magic guilds, including the spirit Genevieve was supposed to obtain. 
Giselle Villard is one of the many Sigil-Bearers. She was the younger sister who spent her time going to parties and socializing while her older sister Genevieve studied hard and moved up rapidly in the ranks of the Nouveau Mages Guild. The series begins on the day of Genevieve's ascension to the rank of Guild master for the Nouveau guild where she is to receive the spirit of the Nouveau guild. On that day, Giselle is given the Sigil on her hand and consequently absorbs the spirit of the Nouveau guild as well as the six other spirits of the guilds.

Collections
CrossGen released four trade paperbacks containing the first half of the series:
 Mystic 1: Rite of Passage
 Mystic 2: The Demon Queen
 Mystic 3: Siege of Scales
 Mystic 4: Out All Night

In addition, the company announced two additional which went unreleased due to CrossGen's bankruptcy:
 Mystic 5: Master Class
 Mystic 6: The Mathemagician

Marvel limited series

Marvel Comics relaunched Mystic in a four-issue limited series in 2011 written by G. Willow Wilson with art by David López. It was very different from the original series; Giselle and Genevieve are now poor orphan sisters in the steampunk world of Hyperion who secretly teach themselves the Noble Arts, a magical technology that only the nobility of Hyperion are allowed to study. Wilson described the series as "high-fantasy Mean Girls meets Les Misérables".

The limited series was collected in 2011 in a trade paperback titled The Tenth Apprentice.

References

Sources 
 The 11th Hour #16 (Oct. 2000): Mystic (review of CrossGen series)
 The CrossGen Creator Watch (Feb. 28, 2005)

2000 comics debuts
CrossGen titles